John William Stayton (December 24, 1830 – July 5, 1894) was a justice of the Supreme Court of Texas from November 1881 to July 1894, serving as chief justice from March 1888 to July 1894.

References

Justices of the Texas Supreme Court
1830 births
1894 deaths
19th-century American judges